Scot Andrew Bennett (born 30 November 1990) is an English professional footballer who plays as a defender or midfielder for  club Newport County.

Career

Exeter City
Bennett was born in Newquay, Cornwall and started his career with Exeter City's youth system. He made his first-team debut for Exeter as a substitute in the 74th minute of a 1–0 home victory over Swindon Town in League One on 29 March 2011.

Bennett scored his first goal on 26 November 2011 in a 3–0 home win over Tranmere Rovers. Bennett signed a new contract, the length of which was undisclosed, with Exeter in April 2012. In July 2014, Exeter manager Paul Tisdale announced that Bennett would succeed Danny Coles as captain.

Notts County

Bennett signed for newly relegated League Two club Notts County on a two-year contract on 27 May 2015. On 8 October 2015, he joined Notts County's divisional rivals Newport County on loan until January 2016. He made his debut for Newport when starting in their 3–0 away defeat against Mansfield Town on 10 October 2015. Bennett scored his first goal for Newport on 8 November 2015 in their 2–2 away draw with Brackley Town in the FA Cup first round. He was recalled by Notts County on 31 December 2015.

On 11 March 2016, Bennett joined Notts County's League Two rivals York City on loan until the end of the 2015–16 season. He debuted the following day when starting York's 1–1 home draw with Barnet.

Newport County
Bennett's contract at Notts County was cancelled by mutual consent on 2 June 2016, and the same day he rejoined Newport County on a two-year contract. Bennett was part of the Newport squad that completed the 'Great Escape' with a 2–1 victory at home to Notts County on the final day of the 2016–17 season, which ensured Newport's survival in League Two. Bennett signed a new two-year contract with Newport in April 2018. He was part of the team that reached the League Two play-off final at Wembley Stadium on 25 May 2019. Newport lost to Tranmere Rovers 1–0 after a goal in the 119th minute. In June 2020 Bennett was released by Newport County at the end of the 2019–20 season. On 4 August 2020 Bennett rejoined Newport on a one-year contract. Bennett played for Newport in the League Two playoff final at Wembley Stadium on 31 May 2021 which Newport lost to Morecambe, 1-0 after a 107th minute penalty. In June 2021 his Newport contract was extended for a further two years.

Style of play
Bennett plays as a defender or midfielder.

Career statistics

References

External links

Profile  at the Newport County A.F.C. website

1990 births
Living people
People from Newquay
Footballers from Cornwall
English footballers
Association football defenders
Association football midfielders
Exeter City F.C. players
Notts County F.C. players
Newport County A.F.C. players
York City F.C. players
English Football League players